Morianna (Swedish: Morianerna) is a 1965 Swedish thriller film directed by Arne Mattsson  and starring Anders Henrikson, Eva Dahlbeck and Elsa Prawitz. The film's sets were designed by the art director Per-Olav Sivertzen-Falk. It was based on the 1964 novel of the same title by Jan Ekström.

Cast
 Anders Henrikson as 	Verner Vade
 Eva Dahlbeck as Anna Vade
 Heinz Hopf as 	Boris
 Elsa Prawitz as 	Agda Ahlgren
 Erik Hell as 	Ragnar Synnéus
 Tor Isedal as 	Valter Velin
 Lotte Tarp as 	Rita
 Julia Cæsar as Elderly Lady
 Elsa Ebbesen as 	Mrs. Durell
 Olle Andersson as 	Det. Supt. Durell
 Hans Bendrik as 	Det. Ass.
 Curt Ericson asJanitor
 Ella Henrikson as 	Monica Vade
 Walter Norman as Jonas Kellen 
 Elisabeth Odén as 	Ms. Nilsson
 Ove Tjernberg as 	Bengt Ahlgren

References

Bibliography 
 Qvist, Per Olov & von Bagh, Peter. Guide to the Cinema of Sweden and Finland. Greenwood Publishing Group, 2000.

External links 
 

1965 films
Swedish thriller films
1960s thriller films
1960s Swedish-language films
Films directed by Arne Mattsson
Films based on Swedish novels
1960s Swedish films